Sven Müller (born February 7, 1992, in Mainz) is a German-Swiss racing driver. He took the Porsche Supercup title in 2016.

Career 
Müller began his racing career in karting 2004. He remained in karting until 2009. 2010 he started for Eifelland Racing in the ADAC Formel Masters, a formula racing series. He regularly scored points and concluded his first season on the ninth championship position. 2011 Müller participated in the ADAC Formula Masters for ma-con Motorsport. He won four races and finished 12 times on the podium. He became third in the standings behind Pascal Wehrlein and Emil Bernstorff.

2012 Müller starts for Prema Powerteam in the FIA Formula 3 European Championship. He collected three podiums and the 8th place in the final standings. In 2013 he competed in the first seven rounds with Ma-con and the remaining three with Van Amersfoort, resulting 9th with a podium and four top 5 finishes.

Müller raced at the Porsche Carrera Cup Germany in 2014, after joining the Porsche Junioren factory team. 2015 he celebrated his first win of Porsche Mobil 1 Supercup in Hungary on the Hungaroring.

Racing record

Career summary

† As he was a guest driver, Müller was ineligible to score points.

Complete Porsche Supercup results
(key) (Races in bold indicate pole position) (Races in italics indicate fastest lap)

Complete FIA World Endurance Championship results

Complete WeatherTech SportsCar Championship results
(key) (Races in bold indicate pole position; races in italics indicate fastest lap)

† Points only counted towards the Michelin Endurance Cup, and not the overall LMP2 Championship.

Complete Super GT results
(key) (Races in bold indicate pole position) (Races in italics indicate fastest lap)

Complete 24 Hours of Le Mans results

References

External links 
 
 Sven Müller career details at speedweek.de
 

1992 births
Living people
Sportspeople from Mainz
Racing drivers from Rhineland-Palatinate
German racing drivers
ADAC Formel Masters drivers
Formula 3 Euro Series drivers
British Formula Three Championship drivers
FIA Formula 3 European Championship drivers
Porsche Supercup drivers
24 Hours of Daytona drivers
24 Hours of Le Mans drivers
WeatherTech SportsCar Championship drivers
FIA World Endurance Championship drivers
Super GT drivers
24H Series drivers
Prema Powerteam drivers
Porsche Motorsports drivers
ADAC GT Masters drivers
Eifelland Racing drivers
Ma-con Motorsport drivers
Van Amersfoort Racing drivers
Walter Lechner Racing drivers
Rowe Racing drivers
Eurasia Motorsport drivers
Nürburgring 24 Hours drivers
Toksport WRT drivers
Porsche Carrera Cup Germany drivers